This is a list of monarchs who ruled over East Francia, and the Kingdom of Germany (Regnum Teutonicum), from the division of the Frankish Empire in 843 and the collapse of the Holy Roman Empire in 1806 until the collapse of the German Empire in 1918:

East Francia, 843–962

Carolingian dynasty

Conradine dynasty

Ottonian dynasty

Holy Roman Empire, 962–1806
The title "King of the Romans", used in the Holy Roman Empire, was, from the coronation of Henry II, considered equivalent to King of Germany. A king was chosen by the German electors and would then proceed to Rome to be crowned emperor by the pope.

Ottonian dynasty (continued)

Salian dynasty

Supplinburger dynasty

Hohenstaufen dynasty

Interregnum

Changing dynasties

Habsburg dynasty

Modern Germany, 1806–1918

Confederation of the Rhine, 1806–1813

German Confederation, 1815–1866

North German Confederation, 1867–1871

German Empire, 1871–1918

Note on titles
The Kingdom of Germany started out as the eastern section of the Frankish kingdom, which was split by the Treaty of Verdun in 843. The rulers of the eastern area thus called themselves rex Francorum ("king of the Franks"), rex Francorum orientalium ("king of the East Franks"), and later just rex. A reference to the "Germans", indicating the emergence of a German nation of some sort, did not appear until the eleventh century, when the pope referred to his enemy Henry IV as rex teutonicorum, king of the Germans, in order to brand him as a foreigner. The kings reacted by consistently using the title rex Romanorum, king of the Romans, to emphasize their universal rule even before becoming emperor. This title remained until the end of the Empire in 1806, though after 1508 emperors-elect added "king in Germany" to their titles. (Note: in this and related entries, the kings are called kings of Germany, for clarity's sake)
The Kingdom of Germany was never entirely hereditary; rather, ancestry was only one of the factors that determined the succession of kings. During the 10th to 13th centuries, the king was formally elected by the leading nobility in the realm, continuing the Frankish tradition. Gradually the election became the privilege of a group of princes called electors, and the Golden Bull of 1356 formally defined election proceedings.
In the Middle Ages, the king did not assume the title "emperor" (from 982 the full title was Imperator Augustus Romanorum, Venerable Emperor of the Romans) until crowned by the pope. Moving to Italy, he was usually first crowned with the Iron Crown of Lombardy, after which he assumed the title of rex Italiae, king of Italy. After this he would ride on to Rome and be crowned emperor by the pope.
Maximilian I was the first king to bear the title of emperor-elect. After his march to Rome for his Imperial coronation failed in 1508, he had himself proclaimed emperor-elect with papal consent. His successor Charles V also assumed that title after his coronation in 1520 until he was crowned emperor by the pope in 1530. From Ferdinand I onwards, all emperors did not get crowned by the Pope anymore. At the same time, chosen successors of the emperors held the title of king of the Romans, if elected by the college of electors during their predecessor's lifetime.

Emperors are listed in bold. Rival kings, anti-kings, and junior co-regents are italicized.

See also
 Kings of Germany family tree
 List of German monarchs in 1918
 List of German queens
 List of rulers of Austria
 List of rulers of Bavaria
 List of monarchs of Prussia
 List of rulers of Saxony
 List of rulers of Württemberg

Footnotes

External links

 01
Germany
Monarchs, German
Medieval Germany
Early Modern history of Germany
East Francia
Monarchy in Germany